Mollier may refer to:

 Richard Mollier, German professor of Applied Physics and Mechanics ;
 Louis-Marie Mollier, French-American pioneer priest of north-central Kansas ;
 Jean-Yves Mollier, French Contemporary History teacher.